Tom Hayes is a retired American soccer forward who played professionally in the Major Indoor Soccer League and American Indoor Soccer Association.

Hayes graduated from Thomas Aquinas High School in St. Louis, Missouri.  He attended St. Louis University, playing on the men's soccer team from 1982 to 1985.  In 1985, Hayes turned professional with the Louisville Thunder of the American Indoor Soccer Association.  The Thunder won the 1987 AISA championship, then folded soon after.  Head coach Keith Tozer moved to the Los Angeles Lazers where he brought in Hayes and several ex-Thunder players.  On September 30, 1987, Hayes signed with the Los Angeles Lazers of MISL.  He retired at the end of the season.

External links
 Career stats

References

Living people
1963 births
Soccer players from St. Louis
American soccer players
American Indoor Soccer Association players
Louisville Thunder players
Los Angeles Lazers players
Major Indoor Soccer League (1978–1992) players
Saint Louis Billikens men's soccer players
Association football forwards